The women's singles table tennis event was part of the table tennis programme and took place between November 15 and 20, at the Guangzhou Gymnasium.

Schedule
All times are China Standard Time (UTC+08:00)

Results

Finals

Top half

Section 1

Section 2

Section 3

Section 4

Bottom half

Section 5

Section 6

Section 7

Section 8

References

 Official Report – Women's singles

Table tennis at the 2010 Asian Games